Capela Nova is a Brazilian municipality located in the state of Minas Gerais. Its population  is estimated to be 4,634 people living in an area of 111 km2.  The elevation is 935 m.  The city belongs to the mesoregion of Campo das Vertentes and to the microregion of Barbacena, which lies 58 km to the south.

See also
 List of municipalities in Minas Gerais

References

Municipalities in Minas Gerais